Haunted Road is a 2014 Chinese horror thriller film directed by Yijian Tong. It was released on November 13, 2014.

Plot
Seven friends: Xuelian, Zengliang, Huazi, Haojian, Ningmeng, Xiaotian, and Dudu, are on their way to attend a friend's wedding when they see the aftermath of a car accident on a highway. Instead of helping the victim, they move about their business until their car breaks down, forcing them to take shelter at a road stop. Throughout the film, Xuelian gives monologues about her friends: how unsympathetic they are to the victim, how they only view love through sex, and how they only reveal their inner feelings when they are in conflict. Seeing that nobody is at the stop, the seven decide to camp out for the night. Dudu, who is single and loves to eat, is dared to take a selfie across the road. When the lights turn off one by one, Dudu escapes to the service store as the ghost chases her. Xiaotian is bribed by Zengliang to take food and drinks, in the process stealing money at the counter as well as the savings of the car accident victim. While celebrating his findings, he is chased and killed by the ghost.

Xuelian and Haojian decide to search for Dudu after a while. When Haojian professes his love for her, Xuelian ignores it so they can continue the search uninterrupted. They are joined by the lovestruck Ningmeng, who is in love with Haojian, while Zengliang and Huazi have sex in the garage. Xuelian, Haojian, and Ningmeng find Dudu's body at the cafeteria. Panicking, Ningmeng is left behind and killed when the ghost wraps tight cloths and clothesline wires around her. Zengliang and Huazi regroup with the other two after they discover Xiaotian's body in the restroom. Blaming Huazi for making the group not check the accident victim, Haojian tries to kill all of them and is able to injure Zengliang's knee, but is knocked out by Xuelian and left to die at the hands of the ghost.

The remaining trio realize that the deaths are foreshadowed by photos sent to the survivors (Dudu's being sent Xiaotian's, Xiaotian's being sent to Zengliang, Ningmeng's being sent to Huazi, and Haojian's being sent to Xuelian). They futilely try to start a stray car at the garage. Jealous at seeing Xuelian tending to Zengliang's wound, Huazi fakes the cursed photo and strikes Xuelian with an ratchet spanner, apparently killing her. The couple leave the compound until Huazi breaks her leg in a bush. Left at her own fate by Zengliang, Huazi is then killed by the ghost. After briefly seeing an illusion of a crowded road stop, Zengliang reunites with Xuelian, who has survived her injuries. However, he leaves her behind on the road only for him to be killed by the ghost.

Left alone on the road, Xuelian is confronted by the ghost and learns the truth: Xuelian is the car accident victim. Abused and tormented since childhood, Xuelian took the final straw when her boyfriend dumped her in favor of another woman. She tried to commit suicide by swerving her car on the highway, but survived; all of the previous events are her near-death experiences. Her six "friends" are really strangers who chose to stop and help her after witnessing the accident; her previous monologues are her reflections about her trauma. The film closes with Xuelian stating that the six strangers have helped her escape from the darkness and her negative views about the world.

Cast
Hong Soo-ah
Jiang Chao
Musi Ni
Ling Peng
Renata Tan
Taiyu Gao
Yue Xu

Reception

Box office
The film earned  at the Chinese box office.

References

External links

2014 horror films
2014 horror thriller films
Chinese horror thriller films
2014 films
Chinese zombie films